Yusuf ibn Ya'qub ibn Ishaq ibn Ibrahim is a prophet mentioned in the Quran and corresponds to Joseph, a person from the Hebrew and Christian Bible who was said to have lived in Egypt before the New Kingdom. Of Jacob's children, Joseph reportedly had the gift of prophecy. Although the narratives of other prophets are presented in a number of surahs, Joseph's complete narrative appears in only one: Yusuf. Said to be the most detailed narrative in the Quran, it contains more details than its biblical counterpart.

Yusuf is believed to have been the eleventh son of Ya'qub and, according to a number of scholars, his favorite. Ibn Kathir wrote, "Jacob had twelve sons who were the eponymous ancestors of the tribes of the Israelites. The noblest, the most exalted, the greatest of them was Joseph." The narrative begins with Joseph revealing a dream to his father, which Jacob recognizes. In addition to the role of God in his life, the story of Yusuf and Zulaikha (Potiphar's wife in the Old Testament) became a popular subject of Persian literature and was elaborated over centuries.

In the Quran

The story of Joseph in the Qurʾān is a continuous narrative. There are over one hundred verses, encompassing many years; they "present an amazing variety of sciences and characters in a tightly-knit plot, and offer a dramatic illustration of some of the fundamental themes of the Qurʾān." The Quran notes the story's importance in the third verse: "and We narrate unto you ." Most scholars believe that this refers to Joseph's story; others, including al-Tabari, believe that it refers to the Quran as a whole. It documents the execution of God's rulings despite the challenge of human intervention ("And God hath full power and control over His affairs; but most among mankind know it not").

Before the dream
Muhammad at-Ṭabari provides detailed commentary on the narrative in his chapter on Joseph, relaying the opinions of other well-known scholars. In al–Ṭabari's chapter, the physical beauty of Joseph and his mother Rahyl is introduced; they were said to have had "more beauty than any other human being." His father, Jacob, had given him to his oldest sister to be raised. Al–Ṭabari writes that there was no greater love than what Joseph's aunt felt for him, since she raised him as her own; reluctant to return him to Jacob, she kept him until her death. According to al–Ṭabari, she could do this because of a belt given to her by her father, Isaac: "If someone else acquired it by guile from the person who was supposed to have it, then he would become absolutely subject to the will of the rightful owner." Joseph's aunt puts the belt on Joseph when Jacob is absent; she accuses Joseph of stealing it, and he remains with her until her death. Jacob is reluctant to give Joseph up, and favors him when they are together.

The dream
The narrative begins with a dream, and ends with its interpretation. As the sun appeared over the horizon, bathing the earth in morning glory, Joseph (son of Jacob) awakens delighted by a pleasant dream. Filled with excitement, he runs to his father and reports what he saw.

According to Ibn Kathir, Jacob knows that Joseph will become important in this world and the next. He recognizes that the stars represent his brothers; the sun and moon represent himself and Joseph's mother, Rachel. Jacob tells Joseph to keep the dream secret to protect him from the jealousy of his brothers, who are unhappy with Jacob's love for Joseph. He foresees that Joseph will be the one through whom the prophecy of his grandfather, Ibrahim, would be fulfilled: his offspring would keep the light of Abraham's house alive and spread God's message to mankind. Abu Ya'ala interpreted Jacob's reaction as an understanding that the planets, sun, and moon bowing to Joseph represented "something dispersed which God united." Jacob tells Joseph, "My son, relate not thy vision to thy brothers, lest they concoct a plot against thee: for Satan is a clear enemy to humanity. Thus your Lord has selected you and given you the knowledge to interpret dreams, and has perfected His blessing upon you and upon the family of Jacob just as He perfected it on your forefathers before: Ibrahim and Is-haq (Isaac). Your Lord is Knowing, Wise" (Qur'an, Surah 12 (Yusuf) Ayat 56).

Joseph does not tell his brothers about his dream (unlike the Hebrew Bible version), but they remain very jealous. Al–Ṭabari writes that they said to each other, "Verily Joseph and his brother (Benjamin) are dearer to our father than we are, though we may be a troop. By usbah they meant a group, for they were ten in number. They said, "Our father is plainly in a state of aberration." Joseph has a gentle temperament and is respectful, kind, and considerate, like his brother Benjamin; both are Rachel's sons. From a :

Plot against him

The Quran continues with Joseph's brothers plotting to kill him: "In Joseph and his brothers are signs for those who seek answers. When Joseph's brother said about him: "He is more loved by our father than we are, and we are a group. Our father is in clear error. Let us kill Joseph or cast him to the ground, so that your father's face will be toward you, and after him you will be a community of the truthful." One brother argued against killing him and suggested throwing him into a well, said to be ; a caravan might rescue and enslave him: "Slay not Joseph, but if ye must do something, throw him down to the bottom of the well: he will be picked up by some caravan of travelers." Mujahid ibn Jabr identifies the brother as Simeon. Suddi identifies him as Judah; Qatadah writes that it was the eldest, Reuben: Scholars suggest that Joseph may have been as young as twelve when he was thrown into the well. He would live to be 110 or 120.

The brothers ask their father to let them take Joseph into the desert to play, and promised to watch him. Jacob hesitates, aware of their resentment of their brother. Al–Ṭabari writes that Jacob's excuse is that a wolf might hurt him. The brothers insist, and then throw Joseph into a well. They return with a blood-stained shirt, saying that he had been attacked by a wolf, but Jacob does not believe them.

According to the Quran,

Al–Ṭabari writes that Judah stops the brothers from further harming Joseph, and brings him food. Ibn Kathir writes that Reuben suggested that they put him in the well so he could return later to bring him home. When he returns, Joseph is gone: "So he screamed and tore his clothes. He put blood on the coat of Joseph. When Jacob learned of this, he tore his clothes, wore a black cloak, and was sad for many days." Ibn Abbas writes that the "reason for this trial of Jacob was that he had slaughtered a sheep while he was fasting. He asked a neighbor of his to eat it but he did not. So God tested him with the matter of Joseph." He interprets Joseph's revelation in the well: "When they were unaware" (12:15) means "you will tell them about what they did in a situation in which they will not recognize you." A possible reason for Joseph's enslavement was that after Abraham left Egypt with slaves, "Abraham did not dismount for them (following barefoot). Therefore God revealed to him: 'Since you did not alight for the slaves and those walking barefoot with you, I will punish you by selling one of your descendants into his country.

God's plan to save him
A passing caravan takes Joseph after it stops by the well to draw water and sees the boy inside. They rescue him and sell him into slavery in Misr (Egypt), to a rich man known as Al-'Aziz in the Quran and Potiphar in the Bible. 'Aziz is also known as Qatafir or Qittin. Joseph is taken into 'Aziz's home, and the man tells his wife to treat him well. 

Scholars of Islam cite this point as central to Joseph's story. Joseph rises to a high position in Al-'Aziz's household and, when his brothers later come to Egypt, they do not recognize him. He reaches manhood, and 'Aziz's wife tries to seduce him. Al–Tabari and others note that Joseph is also attracted to her, and al–Ṭabari writes that he does not succumb to her because when they were alone, the "figure of Jacob appeared to him, standing in the house and biting his fingers ... God turned him away from his desire for evil by giving him a sign that he should not do it."

Zulaikha, 'Aziz's wife, rips the back of Joseph's shirt as they race one another to the door where her husband is waiting. She tries to blame Joseph, suggesting that he had attacked her, but Joseph's account of Zulaikha's attempted seduction is confirmed by a member of the household; Azīz believed Joseph and told his wife to beg forgiveness." The household member tells 'Aziz to check Joseph's shirt. If the front is torn, Joseph is guilty; if the back is torn, Zulaikha is guilty. The shirt is torn in the back, and 'Aziz reprimands his wife for lying.

Zulaikha's friends think that she is infatuated with Joseph, and ridicule her for falling in love with a slave. She invites them to her home, and gives them apples and knives to peel them with. Zuleikha then has Joseph walk through the room; the women are so distracted that they cut their fingers with the knives, and she says that she sees Joseph every day. Joseph prays, saying that he would prefer prison to succumbing to Zuleikha and her friends. According to al–Ṭabari, 'Aziz later "grew disgusted with himself for having let Joseph go free ... It seemed good to them to imprison him for a time." The popular story of Joseph and Zulaikha differs in the Quran from the Biblical version, in which Potiphar believes his wife and imprisons Joseph. After 'Aziz' death, Joseph reportedly marries Zulaikha.

Dream interpretation
This account refers to the interaction between Joseph and the ruler of Egypt. Unlike references to the pharaoh in the account of Moses, the story of Joseph refers to the Egyptian ruler as a king rather than a pharaoh. After Joseph had been imprisoned for a few years, God gives Joseph the ability to interpret dreams after he has been imprisoned for several years, a power which makes him popular amongst the other prisoners. Before his imprisonment, two royal servants had been thrown into the dungeon for attempting to poison the food of the king and his family. Joseph asks them about their dreams; one said that he saw himself pressing grapes into wine, and the other said he saw himself with a basket of bread on his head and birds eating from it. Joseph says that the first servant will be released and return to the king, but the second will be executed; both came to pass.

He asks the servant who will be released (Nabu, according to al–Ṭabari) to mention his case to the king. Asked about his time in prison, al–Ṭabari writes that Muhammad said: "If Joseph had not said thatmeaning what he said (to Nabu)he would not have stayed in prison as long as he did because he sought deliverance from someone other than God."

The king dreams that seven fat cows are eaten by seven thin ones and seven ears of corn are replaced with shriveled ears, and is frightened. None of his advisors could interpret it. When the servant who was released from prison heard about it, he remembered Joseph from prison and persuaded the king to send him to Joseph so that he could return with an interpretation. Joseph told the servant that Egypt would face seven years of prosperity and then suffer seven years of famine and that the king should prepare for it so as to avoid great suffering.

Scholars debate as to whether Joseph agreed to interpret the dream right away or if he declared that his name should be cleared in the house of ʿAzīz first. Ṭabari notes that when the messenger came to Joseph and invited him to come to the king, Joseph replied "Go back to your lord and ask him about the case of the women who cut their hands. My lord surely knows their guile." Ibn Kathir agrees with Ṭabari saying that Joseph sought "restitution for this in order that ʿAzīz might know that he was not false to him during his absence" and that Zolayḵā eventually confessed that nothing happened between them. Ṭabari inserts an interesting interaction between Joseph and the angel Gabriel in which Gabriel helps Joseph both gain his freedom and admit to his own desires.

Joseph said, "What you cultivate during the next seven years, when the time of harvest comes, leave the grains in their spikes, except for what you eat. After that, seven years of drought will come, which will consume most of what you stored for them. After that, a year will come that brings relief for the people, and they will, once again, press juice." (Qur'an, 12:4749) Joseph was brought to king and interpreted the dream.

When he became aware of Yusuf's innocence, the king said, "Bring him to me that I may attach him to my person." Then, when he spoke to him, he said: "Verily, this day, you are with us high in rank and fully trusted."" (Quran 12:54)  Upon speaking with Yusuf, the king recognized his virtues, great ability, brilliance, good conduct and perfect mannerisms.  Yusuf said, "Set me over the storehouses of the land; I will indeed guard them with full knowledge" (Quran 12:55).  Thus Yusuf asked the king to appoint him as Minister of Finance.

Use of "king" versus "pharaoh"
In the Qur'an, the title of the Ruler of Egypt during the time of Joseph is specifically said to be "the King" while the Ruler of Egypt during the time of Moses is specifically said to be "Pharaoh" (though as a name without the definite article). This is interesting because according to historical sources, the title Pharaoh only began to be used to refer to the rulers of Egypt (starting with the rule of Thutmose III) in 1479 BCEapproximately 21 years after the prophet Joseph died. But in the narration of Yusuf in the Bible, the titles King and Pharaoh are used interchangeably for the ruler of Egypt in Genesis chapters 3941.

The family reunion
Joseph became extremely powerful. Ibn Kathir relates that the king of Egypt had faith in Joseph and that the people loved and revered him. It is said that Joseph was 30 when he was summoned to the king. "The king addressed him in 70 languages, and each time Joseph answered him in that language." Ibn Is-haq comments, "the king of Egypt converted to Islam at the hands of Joseph."

Joseph's brothers, in the meantime, had suffered while the people of Egypt prospered under Joseph's guidance. Jacob and his family were hungry and the brothers went to Egypt, unaware that Joseph was there and in such a high position. Joseph gave them what they needed but questions them and they reveal that there were once twelve of them. They lie and say that the one most loved by their father, meaning Joseph, died in the desert. Joseph tells them to bring Benjamin, the youngest, to him. They return home to Jacob and persuade him to let Benjamin accompany them in order to secure food. Jacob insists that they bring Benjamin backand this time the brothers are honest when they swear to it. According to Ibn Kathir, Jacob ordered the brothers to use many gates when returning to Egypt because they were all handsome. The Qurʾān itself elaborates that Jacob sensed Joseph.

When the brothers return with Benjamin, Joseph reveals himself to Benjamin. He then gives the brothers the supplies he promised but also put the king's cup into one of the bags. He then proceeds to accuse them of stealing, which the brothers deny. Joseph informs them that whoever it was who stole the cup will be enslaved to the owner and the brothers agree, not realizing the plot against them. Ṭabari reports that the cup was found in Benjamin's sack.

After much discussion and anger, the brothers try to get Benjamin released by offering themselves insteadfor they must keep their promise to their father. Reuben stays behind with Benjamin in order to keep his promise to his father. When the other brothers inform Jacob of what has happened, Jacob does not believe them and becomes blind after crying much over the disappearance of his son. Forty years had passed since Joseph was taken from his father, and Jacob had held it in his heart. Jacob sends the brothers back to find out about Benjamin and Joseph. Upon their return Joseph reveals himself to his brothers and gives them one of his shirts to give to Jacob.

When Jacob receives the shirt, this time as good news, Jacob lays it on his face and regains his vision. He says "Did I not tell you that I know from God what you do not know?" (12:96). Ṭabari says that this means that "from the truth of the interpretation of Joseph's dream in which he saw eleven planets and the sun and the moon bowing down to him, he knew that which they did not know."

Joseph was reunited with his family, and his dream as a child came true as he saw his parents and eleven of his brothers prostrating before him in love, welcome and respect. Ibn Kathir mentions that his mother had already died but there are some who argue that she came back to life. Ṭabari says that she was alive. Joseph eventually died in Egypt. Tradition holds that when Musa (Moses) left Egypt, he took Joseph's coffin with him so that he would be buried alongside his ancestors in Canaan.

Death and burial
Historically, some Muslims also associated Joseph's Tomb with that of the biblical figure. In recent years however, they  claim that an Islamic cleric, Sheikh Yussuf (Joseph) Dawiqat, was buried there two centuries ago.

Legacy
Joseph is one of the most revered men in Islamic history. Having come through an especially noble line of patriarchsAbraham, Isaac and JacobJoseph too was awarded the gift of prophecy like his forefathers. As Kisai, one of the foremost writers on the lives of the Qurʾānic prophets, states, this was also evident in the fact that Joseph was given a staff of light with five branches. On the first branch was written "Abraham, friend of God," on the second, "Isaac, pure of God," on the third, "Ishmael, sacrifice of God", on the fourth, "Jacob, Israelite of God," and on the fifth, "Joseph, Righteous of God."

The Qur'anic narrative about Joseph is perhaps one of the Book's most detailed accounts of the life and deeds of a prophet. Joseph, as a figure, is symbolic of the virtue of beautyhis life being a thing of beauty in itself. Most importantly, though, Joseph is admired as a great preacher of the Islamic faith, who had an extremely strong commitment to God and one who tried to get people to follow the path of righteousness. The Qur'an recounts Joseph's declaration of faith:

Joseph is also described as having the three characteristics of the ideal statesman: pastoral ability (developed while Joseph was young and in charge of his fathers flocks); household management (from his time in Potiphar's house) and self-control (as we see on numerous occasions not just with Potiphar's wife): "He was pious and God fearing, full of temperance, ready to forgive, and displayed goodness to all people."

Commentaries
Yūsuf is largely absent from the Hadīth. Discussions, interpretations and retellings of Sūrat Yūsuf may be found in the Tafsīr literature, the universal histories of al-Ṭabarī, Ibn Kat̲h̲īr, along with others, and in the poetry and pietistic literatures of many religions in addition to Judaism and Christianity.

According to Imam Ja'far al-Sadiq, a great grandson of Muhammad and prominent source of Hadith during his time, Yusuf was among the righteous servants and safe in the world from becoming an adulterer and immoral one.

Yūsuf serves as a model of virtue and wisdom in spiritual literature. He is extolled in Ṣūfī manuals such as that of Abū Naṣr al-Sarrād̲j̲'s K. al-Lumaʿ as a paragon of forgiveness. "He also epitomizes the chastity that is based on complete trust in God, for it was his absolute piety that prompted God to personally intervene to prevent him from the transgression of succumbing to sexual temptation." He is an archetype of wisdom and faith, although arguably still human (as is shown in his interactions with his brothers when in Egypt). As has been noted, commentary never fails to mention Yūsuf's beautya strong theme in post-Ḳurʾānic literature. Firestone notes, "His beauty was so exceptional that the behavior of the wife of al-ʿAzīz is forgiven, or at least mitigated, because of the unavoidably uncontrollable love and passion that his countenance would rouse in her. Such portrayals are found in many genres of Islamic literatures, but are most famous in Nūr al-Dīn ʿAbd al-Raḥmān Dijāmī's [q.v.] Yūsuf wa Zulayk̲h̲ā, which incorporates many of the motifs and attributes associated with his beauty in earlier works."

Certainly by the 7th century AH (13th century ACE), and up to the 10th century AH (16th century ACE), in Persian areas at the very least, Yūsuf was incorporated into the world of artand was thus considered a patron. In addition to poetry and other writing, paintings and other forms of art were composed to not only exemplify his physical beauty but his magnificent character as well.

Esoteric commentaries in Arabic
"The Story of Joseph" is a running narrative, but the esoteric commentaries fill in gaps in the story, make connections and identifying characters. Adding detail to the novella is not uncommon, and most complement information already known from the holy texts. According to the Encyclopedia of Iranic, much of this comes from the Esra'Illiyat, that is, traditions drawn from the body of knowledge about Biblical events and people shared by Christians, Jews, and early Muslims. A fairly consistent source for this tradition goes back to the authority of Ibn 'Abbas (d. ca. 687) or Esma'il b. 'Abd-al-Rahman Soddi (d. 745).

Among the commentaries, Ṭabari includes the greatest number of traditions supplying information not found in the Qurʾānic story. Tabari's commentary on Joseph presents numerous sources representing different traditions. "All the Arabic commentaries on Surat Yusuf include explanations and discussions of lexicography and grammar to clarify the literal meaning of the Qurʾānic story of Joseph. They focus on smaller details, not big-picture meaning."

Additional themes presented here have to do with the character of God, including that of being "". Mustansir Mir shows Joseph's story as a vindication of God's dominion and the continual fulfillment of his will. According to Mir's article in The Muslim World (1986), this Surah is the only one to point to the word 'Ghalib' as a divine attribute. This does not disregard the theme of balance between divine decree and human freedom.

A medieval Arabic verse retelling of the Qur'anic Joseph story also exists.

Persian commentaries
Farsi tafsirs vary considerably in the extent to which they included explanatory discussions of the technical nature and Arabic questions. Thus, some Persian commentaries on Surat Yusuf resemble their Arabic counterparts. Other commentaries consist mainly of a translation of the versus and storytelling, which is unlike Tabari's style. Mystical readings of Joseph, from the 6th century AH (12th century ACE) tafsir of Maybundi are an example of this influence.

Storytelling becomes more prominent in Persian tafsirs. They are known especially for their colorful and dramatic depiction of scenes in the narratives. It is often described as "lively," which can be seen in Joseph's interactions with his brothers. Another example of Persian expansion of the language is when the brother's realize that Joseph is going to keep Benjamin in Egypt. One of the brothers, often Reuben, is said to have threatened Joseph that he would yell so loudly that every pregnant woman would immediately deliver her child.

Judaeo-Persian literature had strong influences on medieval Islamic writings as well. Scholars note that 'genuine' Judaeo-Persian literature seemed to have been developed during the Īl-K̲h̲ān dynasty over Persia, from the end of the 7th13th century on.

Sufi commentaries
The Sufi tradition tends to focus its attention on the lessons and deeper meanings, "that may be elicited from the Qur'anic verses and the story of Joseph provides them with ample scope to draw lessons of mystical, ethical and theological and metaphysical significance." All the commentaries of this tradition spend time on the themes of preordination and God's omnipotence. Two teachings stand out here: "the first is that God is the controller and provider of all things and that human beings should have complete trust in Him and the second is the prevailing of the divine decree over human contrivance and design." The love story itself is also a central theme in Sufi discussions.

The theme of love seeps into more than just the story of Yusuf and Zulaikhah. Jacob becomes a prototype of the mystic lover of God and Zolayḵā goes from temptress to a lover moving from human to divine love. There were two kinds of love present in the story—the passion of a lover as well as the devotion of a father to his lost son. Joseph also represents the eternal beauty as it is manifested in the created world. Joseph's story can be seen as a parable of God's way, a way which the mystic should focus his journey—following the way of love.

"The Persian versions include full narratives, but also episodic anecdotes and incidental references which occur in prose works, didactic and lyrical poetry and even in drama. The motif was suited to be used by Sufi writers and poets as one of the most important models of the relationship between the manifestation of Divine beauty in the world and the loving soul of the mystic."

There was also a Jewish presence. According to W. J. Fischer (2013), "Persian Jews, far from living in a cultural vacuum in isolation, took also a keen interest in the literary and poetical works of their Muslim neighbors and shared with them the admiration for the classical Persian poetry." Thus, similar styles in meter and form translated easily between the two. The poet D̲j̲āmī is known for his reflection on stories such as Yūsuf and Zulayk̲h̲ā. Which was made accessible in Hebrew transliteration and are preserved in various libraries in Europe, America and in Jerusalem.

Shia commentaries
It is narrated in Kitab al-Kafi by Ja'far al-Sadiq that when the fire was set for Abraham, Jibril brought him a dress from paradise and made him wear it. With that dress on him, nothing of the cold or heat would harm him. When Abraham was close to death, he placed it in a covering and gave it to Ishaq who passed it to Yaqub. When Joseph was born, it was passed to him. When he took it out of its covering in Egypt, Jacob felt its fragrance as he said, "I smell Joseph's scent. I hope that you will not accuse me of senility (12:94)". It was the same shirt that was sent from paradise.

Gender and sexuality
The story provides insight into Qurʾānic models of sexuality and gender and an understanding of hegemonic masculinity. In Surah Yusuf, a prophet, who is very different from other prophets in the Qurʾān, is encountered, but the tradition shows that prophets are chosen to guide other human beings to God, according to the Qurʾān . Yusuf is similar to other prophets in that his story conveys God's message, but also he is demonstrated in a biography that "begins and ends with God. For this reason all prophets are equal: their sole purpose is to highlight God's divinity but not their own significance over against other prophets."

Ibn Kathir uses Joseph's resistance to Zolayḵā as a basis for the prophetic statement about men who are saved by God because they fear Him. However, other scholars, especially women scholars such as Barbara Freyer Stowasser, think this interpretation is demeaning of women—perhaps believing that this seeks to show that women do not have the same connection. Stowasser writes: "Both appear in the Hadith as symbolized in the concept of fitna (social anarchy, social chaos, temptation) which indicates that to be a female is to be sexually aggressive and, hence, dangerous to social stability. The Qurʾān, however, reminds human beings to remain focused on submission to God."

In Islamic traditions  God is not chastising the mutual attraction and love between them but that he points to the associated factors that made their love affair impossible.   The Qur'an remains silent on the ultimate fate of Zolayḵā.

See also
Yusuf, chapter 12 of the Quran
Holy Land
Biblical and Quranic narratives
List of legends in the Quran
Prophet Joseph (TV series)
Prophets and messengers in Islam
Qisas al-Anbiya

References

External links
Prophet Joseph (Yusuf)
The meaning of Joseph's story in the Qur'an from the standpoint of his dream
The Story of Yusuf.

Hebrew Bible prophets of the Quran
Islam